The Rooster Prince, also sometimes translated as The Turkey Prince, is a Jewish mashal or parable told by Rabbi Nachman of Breslov, founder of the Breslov form of Hasidic Judaism.  It was first told orally, and later published by Nathan of Breslov in Sippurei Ma'asiot, a collection of stories by Rebbe Nachman.  It has since appeared in numerous folklore anthologies and works on Hasidic storytelling.

Story
In this story, a prince goes insane and believes that he is a rooster (or turkey.)  He takes off his clothes, sits naked under the table, and pecks at his food on the floor.  The king and queen are horrified that the heir to the throne is acting this way.  They call in various sages and healers to try and convince the prince to act human again, but to no avail.  Then a new wise man comes to the palace and claims he can cure the prince.  He takes off his clothes and sits naked under the table with him, claiming to be a rooster, too.  Gradually the prince comes to accept him as a friend.  The sage then tells the prince that a rooster can wear clothes, eat at the table, etc.  The Rooster Prince accepts this idea and, step-by-step, begins to act normally, until he is completely cured.

Interpretations
The main interpretation of this story is that the prince represents a simple Jew who has forgotten his true self, and the sage represents a Hasidic Rebbe who has the cure for his soul. Rather than condemn the simple Jew for being non-religious, the Rebbe "descends" to his level to meet him where he is, then shows him how to return to God, step by step, and in a manner that he can accept.  Some Breslov Hasidim say that the "wise man" is Rebbe Nachman, himself. In 1991, Rabbi Avraham Greenbaum, himself a Breslover Hasid, published an entire self-help book based on this story, entitled Under the Table and How to Get Up. This book goes, step by step, through the story, expanding each detail into a personal lesson on spiritual growth.

As noted, above, there is some debate as to which barnyard bird was originally being referred to in the story.  The parable was originally told in Yiddish.  Some early translations and oral traditions rendered the Yiddish word  indik as "Indian rooster".  (A  well-known example is in Souls on Fire by Elie Wiesel, where he retells the story as heard from his Hasidic grandfather.) Others thought the word referred to the male junglefowl or a peacock.  More recently, some translators, most notably the Breslov Research Institute, have rendered it as turkey. (The fan tail of a turkey does resemble that of a peacock.) These differences do not affect the basic plot of the story.

In popular culture
"The Rooster Prince" is the title of the second episode of the FX television series Fargo. It was written by show creator Noah Hawley and was directed by Adam Bernstein.

References

Sources
Greenbaum, Avraham (1991). Under the Table and How to Get Up. Jerusalem: Breslov Research Institute.
Kaplan, Aryeh (1983). Rabbi Nachman's Stories. Jerusalem: Breslov Research Institute, pp. 479–80. A scholarly commentary.

Further reading
Tooinsky, Izzi (2001). The Turkey Prince. London: Penguin Putnam. A children's book version, illustrated by Edwina White.
Waxman, Sydell. (2000). The Rooster Prince. Pitspopany Press. In this children's version, the sage who cures the prince is a poor boy from the village. Illustrated by Giora Karmi.
Wiesel, Elie (1972). Souls on Fire: Portraits and Legends of Hasidic Masters. New York: Random House, pp. 170–171.

External links
 , starring Yehuda Barkan as the king

Yiddish-language folklore
Breslov Hasidism
Jewish folklore
Mental health in fiction